Frunzensky District is the name of several administrative and municipal districts in Russia. The districts are generally named for Mikhail Frunze, a Bolshevik leader.

Districts of the federal subjects
Frunzensky District, Saint Petersburg, an administrative district of the federal city of Saint Petersburg

City divisions
Frunzensky City District, Ivanovo, a city district of Ivanovo, the administrative center of Ivanovo Oblast
Frunzensky City District, Saratov, a city district of Saratov, the administrative center of Saratov Oblast
Frunzensky City District, Vladimir, a city district of Vladimir, the administrative center of Vladimir Oblast
Frunzensky City District, Vladivostok, a city district of Vladivostok, the administrative center of Primorsky Krai
Frunzensky City District, Yaroslavl, a city district of Yaroslavl, the administrative center of Yaroslavl Oblast

See also
Frunzensky (disambiguation)
Frunze (disambiguation)

References